In mathematical analysis, the Cauchy index is an integer associated to a real rational function over an interval.  By the Routh–Hurwitz theorem, we have the following interpretation: the Cauchy index of

r(x) = p(x)/q(x)

over the real line is the difference between the number of roots of f(z) located in the right half-plane and those located in the left half-plane.  The complex polynomial f(z) is such that

f(iy) = q(y) + ip(y).

We must also assume that p has degree less than the degree of q.

Definition

 The Cauchy index was first defined for a pole s of the rational function r by Augustin-Louis Cauchy in 1837 using one-sided limits as:

 A generalization over the compact interval [a,b] is direct (when neither a nor b are poles of r(x)): it is the sum of the Cauchy indices  of r for each s located in the interval.
 We can then generalize to intervals of type  since the number of poles of r is a finite number (by taking the limit of the Cauchy index over [a,b] for a and b going to infinity).

Examples

 Consider the rational function:

We recognize in p(x) and q(x) respectively the Chebyshev polynomials of degree 3 and 5. For the pole in zero, we have  since the left and right limits are equal (which is because p(x) also has a root in zero).  
We conclude that  since q(x) has only five roots, all in [−1,1].  We cannot use here the Routh–Hurwitz theorem as each complex polynomial with f(iy) = q(y) + ip(y) has a zero on the imaginary line (namely at the origin).

External links
 The Cauchy Index

Mathematical analysis